NHK Party, self-abbreviated as the NHK (NHK), also known as Anti-NHK Party in English language media, is a populist and single-issue political party in Japan founded on 17 June 2013 by activist Takashi Tachibana. The party's slogan is "NHK o bukkowasu!" ("Destroy NHK!"). Currently, the party's manifesto have expanded to cover other issues, including lower taxes, increasing military defense capability, and reaching energy independence through nuclear energy. The party has undergone a series of renames, the most recent being "Politician Girls 48 Party".

History

The founder of the party, Takashi Tachibana, is a former employee of Japan's national public broadcasting organization NHK. He resigned from his position in the accounting department at NHK after having leaked internal corruption to weekly magazine Shūkan Bunshun in 2005. In 2012, he founded the "Tachibana one-man broadcasting station", a YouTube channel that vowed to fight against NHK. In 2013, this evolved into The Party to Protect the People from NHK. Tachibana used YouTube to bypass the mass media, which would not cover his activism. Over the years, he used YouTube to gain multiple local council seats. Finally, in 2019, the party won its first seat in the Diet in the summer 2019 House of Councillors election. The party also gained a seat in the House of Representatives when Hodaka Maruyama joined the party on 29 July 2019.

Celebrity YouTuber Yoshikazu Higashitani was elected to the House of Councillors in 2022 but was expelled in March 2023 for not attending any sessions, reputedly due to fear of being arrested if he were to visit Japan.

The party mainly exists to counter bad behaviour by NHK license fee money collectors, who Tachibana says have connections to the yakuza. The party issues a special sticker to protect citizen's properties from these collectors and has a call center to help people avoid paying the license fee. While it is required by law to make a contract with NHK and pay if one owns a device capable of receiving the NHK signal (for example, a regular TV), the law does not impose any punishment for nonpayment of the license fee. Lacking a means of criminal prosecution, NHK has resorted to using debt collectors to pressure people for payment, and Tachibana wants to eliminate the license fee system and make NHK like any other subscription television channel, where only those that want to watch it must pay.

The rise of the party is described as part of rising distrust of the mass media in Japan by researcher Max Guerrera-Sapone.

Party name history
This change, the addition of the character  (our) before 国民 (people/citizen) did not alter the meaning of the party's name, but was intended to allow the party to use the official abbreviation , that of the ruling Liberal Democratic Party. This was rejected by the Internal Affairs Ministry, however, and so the abbreviation was instead changed to "NHK Party". The party's official website used the English name "The Party to Protect Citizens from NHK", but the English-speaking press has preferred the translation "The Party to Protect the People from NHK". The party again changed its name to The Party that Teaches How to Not Pay the NHK License Fee on 5 February 2021, and announced that it intended to keep changing its name in future, while maintaining the "NHK Party" short form as the party's common name. On 17 May 2021, the party changed its name to The Party to Protect People from Old Political Parties. On 28 June 2021, the party changed its name to Storm Party. On 21 July 2021, the party changed its name to The party fighting against NHK in the trial for violating Article 72 of the Attorney Act. On 20 January 2022, the party changed its name again to The party that protects those who do not pay the NHK license fee. On 25 April 2022, the party again changed its name to NHK Party, with its self-abbreviation being "NHK". On March 8, 2023, it was announced that the party would once again rename itself as Seijika Joshi 48 Tō.

Leadership

List of leaders

Election results

House of Representatives

House of Councillors

Gubernatorial

Tokyo

Notes

References

External links
 Takashi Tachibana YouTube Page
 

Political parties established in 2013
2013 establishments in Japan
Single-issue political parties
Television in Japan
Political parties in Japan
Populist parties
Populism in Japan
Direct democracy parties
NHK